Michael Riley “Mike” Lee (born June 11, 1983) is an American professional rodeo cowboy who specializes in bull riding. He was the 2004 Professional Bull Riders (PBR) PBR World Champion. He competed consistently in said organization from 2002 to 2017. However, he announced his retirement from the PBR in November 2017. He then competed in the Professional Rodeo Cowboys Association (PRCA), Championship Bull Riding (CBR), and Tuff Hedeman Bull Riding Tour (THBR) circuits, but later mainly rode in regional semi-professional bull riding organizations for the next five years. In the summer of 2022, he announced on his Instagram page his return to the PBR.

Career milestones

Lee rode bulls while growing up, and he joined the PBR’s Touring Pro Division in 2001 (then known as the Challenger Tour) when he was 18 years old. He also competed in the Professional Rodeo Cowboys Association and filled his permit within months. Lee first broke onto the PBR’s Premier Series in 2002. He became the first rider to win both the PBR World Finals event title and World Championship simultaneously, which he accomplished in 2004. He is also the first rider to win the PBR World Championship without a regular-season event win. He qualified for the PBR World Finals every single year from 2002 to 2017.

Lee was an early adapter among bull riders who favored a helmet to the familiar cowboy hat, which he attributes to avoidance and exacerbation of career and life-threatening injuries. He credits the helmet for having saved his life after incurring a severe head injury and skull fracture at a PRCA rodeo in Fort Smith, Arkansas, in 2003, which required brain surgery. Lee is the first world champion bull rider to have competed his entire professional career with a helmet. The year 2007 was a difficult one professionally for him due to severe head injuries.

On Saturday night, April 16, 2016, in the Stanley Performance In Action Invitational, in Billings, Montana (Lee’s place of birth), he joined Guilherme Marchi as the second bull rider in PBR history to complete 500 qualified rides. He rode Tahonta's Magic for 86.75 points during Round 2. At that time, Lee was 500-for-1,068 (46.82 percent) in his Built Ford Tough Series (BFTS) career. He has 14 event wins, 23 90-points rides, and one world championship. He has obtained 50 or more qualified rides in a season three times. One time was a career best of 54 qualified rides in 2008. About all of his success at the time of his 500 ride accomplishment, Lee had this to say, "It is all thanks to God that I am still here," Lee concluded. "Just to stay healthy and be blessed this much is something to be happy for and have joy for."

Lee qualified for the PBR World Finals a record sixteen consecutive times (2002-2017). In November 2017 he announced via Facebook that he was going to focus his bull riding career in other associations. In 2018, he rode on the Professional Rodeo Cowboys Association (PRCA), Championship Bull Riding (CBR), and Tuff Hedeman Bull Riding (THBR) tours.

In the summer of 2022, after five years of mainly riding in regional semi-professional bull riding circuits, Lee announced on his Instagram page his return to the PBR.

Faith on the road
Lee credits his successes to his Christian faith. "Taking a knee after each ride, no matter the outcome, Lee thanks God on the arena for safety and protection. Lee has a cross appliqué on his chaps and, whenever a fan asks for a signature, he accompanies it with three crosses". Lee was an instructor at the former Christian Bull Riding and Bull Fighting School which was held at the Frost Ranch in Lane, Oklahoma. It was an annual event in honor of Lane Frost, an iconic bull rider who died of injuries from a bucking bull in Cheyenne, Wyoming. On October 8, 2017, the school announced it was closing. It ran every June from 2005 to 2016.

Personal life

Lee was born in Billings, Montana, on June 11, 1983. When he was 4 years old, the family moved to Paradise, Texas. Later on, they moved to Decatur, Texas, where he still lives.

References

External links
Official Website
PBR.com Bio
ProBullStats.com

1983 births
Living people
People from Wise County, Texas
Sportspeople from Billings, Montana
Bull riders
21st-century Christians
American evangelicals
People from Decatur, Texas